Edited by Byron Preiss, Raymond Chandler's Philip Marlowe: a Centennial Celebration is an anthology of short stories collected for the centenary of Raymond Chandler's birth, in 1988. Containing 23 stories by such noted crime-writers as Max Allan Collins, Sara Paretsky, Loren D. Estleman, Stuart M. Kaminsky, Ed Gorman and Eric Van Lustbader each tale takes place in one of the years that Philip Marlowe was active as a private eye (1935–1959). As well, the anthology includes The Pencil, Chandler's last Marlowe short story.

Stories
The Perfect Crime by Max Allan Collins
The Black-Eyed Blonde by Benjamin M. Schutz
Gun Music by Loren D. Estleman
Saving Grace by Joyce Harrington
Malibu Tag Team by Jonathan Valin
Sad-Eyed Blonde by Dick Lochte
The Empty Sleeve by W. R. Philbrick
Dealer's Choice by Sara Paretsky
Red Rock by Julie Smith
The Deepest South by Paco Ignacio Taibo II
Consultation in the Dark by Francis M. Nevins, Jr.
In the Jungle of Cities by Roger L. Simon
Star Bright by John Lutz
Stardust Kill by Simon Brett
Locker 246 by Robert J. Randisi
Bitter Lemons by Stuart M. Kaminsky
The Man Who Knew Dick Bong by Robert Crais
Essence D'Orient by Edward D. Hoch
In the Line of Duty by Jeremiah Healy
The Alibi by Ed Gorman
The Devil's Playground by James Grady
Asia by Eric Van Lustbader
Mice by Robert Campbell
The Pencil by Raymond Chandler

Second Edition
A second edition, published in 1999, contained an additional two stories, as well as a new introduction by Robert B. Parker.

Sixty-Four Squares by J. Madison Davis
Summer in Idle Valley by Roger L. Simon

1988 anthologies
Mystery anthologies
Alfred A. Knopf books